Edward Alexander Beltrán Suárez (born January 18, 1990 in Tunja) is a Colombian cyclist, who last rode for UCI Continental team .

Major results

2010
 2nd Overall Vuelta a Colombia U23
1st Stages 1 (TTT) & 4
 2nd Overall Girobio
2011
 3rd Overall Tour do Rio
2012
 3rd Overall Vuelta a la Independencia Nacional
 6th Overall Vuelta al Mundo Maya
1st Young rider classification
2013
 1st Overall Vuelta al Mundo Maya
1st Stages 1 & 2
 1st Stage 8 Clásico RCN
2019
 10th Overall Tour of the Gila

References

External links

1990 births
Living people
Colombian male cyclists
Sportspeople from Boyacá Department
21st-century Colombian people